Bannu also called Bana and Bani is a city located on the Kurram River in southern Khyber Pakhtunkhwa, Pakistan. It is the capital of Bannu Division. Bannu's residents are primarily members of the Banuchi tribe and speak Banuchi (Baniswola) dialect of Pashto which is similar to the distinct Waziristani dialect. Total 5 Tehsil in Bannu.

The major industries of Bannu are cloth weaving, sugar mills and the manufacturing of cotton fabrics, machinery and equipment. It is famous for its weekly Jumma fair. The district forms a basin drained by the Kurram and Gambila (or Tochi) rivers.

Etymology
According to the philologist Michael Witzel, the city was originally known in Avestan as Varəna, from which its modern name derives. The ancient Sanskrit grammarian, Pāṇini, recorded its name as Varṇu.

During the 6th century BCE, the basin around Bannu was known as Sattagydia (Old Persian: 𐎰𐎫𐎦𐎢𐏁 Thataguš, country of the "hundred cows").

History

The history of Bannu goes back to prehistoric times, due to its strategic location along the Kurram and Tochi routes which lead into the Indus Valley. Sheri Khan Tarakai is an ancient settlement site located in the Bannu District with ruins of the oldest known village settlement in the Bannu region, which was occupied from the late fifth until the early third millennium BCE. Recent archaeological excavations at Akra, Bannu showed that it was a large urban site that existed throughout the Iron Age and had trade relations with Central Asia.

The sacred texts of Zend Avesta and Vendidad mentions Varəna, the Avestan predecessor of the name for Bannu, as the 14th in the list of the "16 perfect lands" created by Ahura Mazda. According to the Avesta, Varəna was the homeland and birthplace of the legendary King Fereydun (known in Avestan as Θraētaona, and also known as Āθβiiāni, "of the house of Abtin").

In the 6th century BCE, the region around Bannu was known as Sattagydia (lit. "country of 100 cows") and constituted the southern part of the greater region of Paropamisadae. Under the Persian Achaemenid Empire, Sattagydia became part of the Empire's 7th taxation district, which also included the Gandāra, Dadicae, and Aparytae regions. Sattagydia was mentioned in the Behistun inscription of Darius the Great as one of the satrapies in revolt while the king was in Babylon. The revolt was presumably suppressed in 515 BCE.

After being conquered by Alexander in the 4th century BCE, the region became part of the Greek Seleucid Empire for a short while until the Mauryan Empire took control over the region around 305 BCE, as the entire region of North-West India constituting Paropamisadae, Arachosia and Gedrosia was transferred to Mauryan Empire by the Seleucids.

After the decline of Mauryan Empire, the region fell under the administrative and political control of Indo-Greeks, Indo-Scythian and Indo-Parthians successively. Kushan emperor Kujula Kadphises defeated the Indo-Parthians and incorporated the region under the Kushan Empire. In the Tochi Valley of North Waziristan near Bannu, Bactrian language inscriptions originally written in the 9th century have been discovered. This shows that after the collapse of the Kushan Empire, its official language continued in use for at least six more centuries.

After the decline of the Kushan Empire, the region subsequently came under the control of Gupta Empire. The Kidarites began invading the North-West regions of Gupta Empire during the reign of Emperor Kumaragupta. The Gupta Empire ended up losing its control over the region around the early 5th century CE. The Kidarites then too came under the attack from Hephthalites who defeated the Kidarites and appointed sub-rulers and kings to rule over the region. Hūṇa King Mihirakula was the most famous ruler from the Hūṇa Dynasty. Aulikara ruler Yashodharman defeated the Hūṇa King Toramana and took control over most of North-West India. The remnants of the Hepthalite Empire continued to rule over the region until the 9th century CE when the Hindu Shahis came to power and established their rule over the region for over 150 years.

In the late 10th and early 11th century CE, the Ghaznavids conquered the area. Mahmud of Ghazni used the Bannu route for several of his raids deeper into Northern India.

British rule

The city was renamed in 1848 by Herbert Benjamin Edwardes, a lieutenant in the 1st Bengal European Fusiliers Regiment of the East India Company's private army. He ordered the construction of the fort – named Dhulipgarh (Dalipgarh) in honour of the Maharajah of Lahore – at the same time. At the time of its founding, the town was named Dhulipnagar (Dalipnagar). Its name was later changed to Edwardesabad in 1869. In 1903, it received its current name, Bannu.

Bannu was used as the base of operations for all punitive expeditions undertaken by detachments of the British Indian Army to the Tochi Valley and the Waziristan frontier. A military road led from the town of Bannu toward Dera Ismail Khan. This road was built by military engineers under the supervision of a Bannu engineer, Ram N. Mullick. Mullick graduated from Banaras Engineering College and had served in Iraq and Lahore as an expert in heavy earth-moving equipment before the independence of Pakistan in 1947.

According to 1941 Census, Bannu was a Hindu majority city. 

Mallak Jaffar Khan Yousafzai was the Chief of Ghoriwala, Bannu. Progenitor of the Jafar Khel branch of Mughal Khel(Yousafzai) Tribe of Bannu Circa 1826-1820.

According to the Imperial British Gazetteer, Bannu was described by the following: 
[The population in 1901 was] 14,291, including cantonment and civil lines (4,349). It was founded in 1848 by Lieutenant (afterwards Sir Herbert) Edwardes, who selected the site for political reasons. The fort, erected at the same time, bore the name of Dhulipgarh (Dalipgarh), in honour of the Maharaja of Lahore; and the bazar was also known as Dhulipnagar (Dalipnagar). A town gradually grew up around the bazar, and many Hindko speaking Hindu traders moved there from Bazar Ahmad Khan, which had formed the commercial center of the Bannu valley prior to annexation. The Church Missionary Society supports a small church and a high school founded in 1865. The cantonment centers in the fort of Dhulipgarh. Its garrison consists of a mountain battery, a regiment of native cavalry, and two regiments of infantry. The municipality was constituted in 1867.

The municipal receipts and expenditure during the ten years ending 1903–1904 averaged Rs. 46,000. In 1903–1904 the income was Rs. 47,000 chiefly derived from octroi; and the expenditure was Rs. 55,000. The receipts and expenditure of cantonment funds during the ten years ending 1902–3 averaged Rs. 4,200 and Rs. 3,700. The profuse irrigation and insufficient drainage of the surrounding fields render Bannu an unhealthy station. The town has a considerable trade, including fish guts and butts. Also, embracing the whole traffic in local produce of the Bannu valley. The nearest railway station is at Kohat on the Khushalgarh-Thal branch of the North-Western Railway, 79 miles distant by road. A weekly fair collects an average number of 8,000 buyers and sellers. The chief articles of trade are cloth, live-stock, wool, cotton, tobacco and grain. Bannu possesses a dispensary and two high schools, a public library and a town hall known as the Nicholson Memorial.

1947 Bannu Jirga

On 21 June 1947 in Bannu, a jirga was held by Pashtun leaders including Bacha Khan, his brother Chief Minister Dr Khan Sahib, the Khudai Khidmatgars, members of the Provincial Assembly, Mirzali Khan (Faqir of Ipi), and other tribal chiefs, just seven weeks before the Partition of India. The jirga declared the Bannu Resolution,  which demanded that the Pashtuns be given a choice to have an independent state of Pashtunistan composing all Pashtun territories of British India, instead of being made to join either India or Pakistan. However, the British Raj refused to comply with the demand of this resolution, in response to which the Khudai Khidmatgars boycotted the 1947 North-West Frontier Province referendum for merging the province into Pakistan.

2022 Pashtun National Jirga

On 11–14 March 2022, the Pashtun National Jirga was held at Mirakhel in Bannu in order to defend the rights of the Pashtun people in the country. The critical issues which were faced by the Pashtuns were discussed during the jirga in a bid to suggest solutions to them.

Geography

Climate
Bannu has a hot semi-arid climate (Köppen BSh) with extremely hot summers and mild winters. The average annual temperature is 24.8 °C (76.6 °F), with the hottest month being June with an average high of 42.2 °C (108.0 °F) and the coolest month being January with an average low of 5.9 °C (42.6 °F). The average annual precipitation is 311.8 mm (12.28 in), with the majority falling in the monsoon season from July to September.

Education 
The first public sector university, University of Science and Technology, Bannu, opened in 2005. Bannu also has a medical college, Bannu Medical College, and a campus of University of Engineering and Technology, Peshawar. The oldest and most renowned public sector institution is Government Post-Graduate College Bannu, which started operating in 1951.

Notable people
Zahid Akram Durrani, Deputy Speaker of the National Assembly of Pakistan
Peter Gracey (1921–2006), English cricketer
Abdul Hamid (field hockey), Former Olympian and Ex Secretary General Pakistan Hockey Federation 
Abdul Rashid (field hockey, born 1947), Former Olympian
Ghulam Ishaq Khan, Former President of Islamic Republic of Pakistan
Qazi Mohib, Former Olympian and Ex Captain Pakistan Hockey Team
Akram Khan Durrani, Former Chief Minister of Khyber Pakhtunkhwa
Dr. Qibla Ayaz, Chairman, Pakistan Council of Islamic Ideology 
Harbans Kapoor, Former Member of the Uttarakhand Legislative Assembly
Shah Muhammad Wazir, Member of Khyber Pakhtunkhwa Assembly
Ayesha Gulalai Wazir, Former Member of the National Assembly of Pakistan
Dost Muhammad Khan, Former Chief Justice of Supreme Court of Pakistan
Zakir Khan (cricketer)
Nasir Iqbal, International Squash Player
Khushdil Shah, International Cricket Player
Sadia Gul, International Squash Player
Zartaj Gul Wazir, Former Minister of Climate Change of Pakistan
Ghazi Sial, Renowned Poet and Pashto Folk Songs Writer
Jaman Lal Sharma, Former Indian Field Hockey Player

See also
 Bannu District
 Bannu Division
 List of cities in Khyber Pakhtunkhwa by population
 Mirzali Khan
 Ghoriwala
 Waziristan
 Bannu Resolution
Pashtun National Jirga
Spin Tangi(Hathi Khel) Massacre

References

Populated places in Bannu District
Bannu District
Populated places established in 1848
Cities in Khyber Pakhtunkhwa